The Cordelia's crow (Euploea cordelia) is a species of nymphalid butterfly in the Danainae subfamily. It is endemic to Sulawesi, Indonesia.

References

Sources

Euploea
Butterflies of Indonesia
Endemic fauna of Indonesia
Fauna of Sulawesi
Butterflies described in 1912
Taxonomy articles created by Polbot